The Hän language (alternatively spelled as Haen) (also known as Dawson, Han-Kutchin, Moosehide; ISO 639-3 haa) is a Northern Athabaskan language spoken by the Hän Hwëch'in (translated to people who live along the river, sometimes anglicized as Hankutchin).  Athabascan refers to the interrelated complexity of languages spoken in Canada and Alaska each with its own dialect: the village of Eagle, Alaska in the United States and the town of Dawson City, Yukon Territory in Canada, though there are also Hän speakers in the nearby city of Fairbanks, Alaska. Furthermore, there was a decline in speakers in Dawson City as a result of the influx of gold miners in the mid-19th century.

Hän is in the Northern Athabaskan subgrouping of the Na-Dené language family. It is most closely related to Gwich'in and Upper Tanana.

Phonology

Consonants
The consonants of Hän are listed below with IPA notation on the left, the standard orthography in :

Vowels

Revitalization 
There are about a dozen people, all elderly, who speak Hän as their native language, though there is a growing second-language speaker community. 

The Tr'ondëk Hwëch'in (formerly known as the Dawson First Nation) in the Yukon Territory support the revitalization of Hän, and there are current efforts to revive the language locally. There is an effort to promote traditional skills and finding a balance between the way of the newcomer's which further promotes the development and revitalization of the language. As of September 2022, there was only one fluent speaker of Hän in Yukon, a 95 year old elder.

Since 1991, the Robert Service School in Dawson City has hosted the Hän Language program, and the Tr'ondëk Hwëch'in supports adult language classes and bi-annual cultural gatherings.

There are many other resources used to learn Hän, particularly online ones such as, FirstVoices and Yukon Native Learning Centre. These online learning language tools teach the tradition, culture, history, and the language of Hän.

Further reading 
 Manker, Jonathan, and Tsuu T’ina Nation (2013). The Syntax of Sluicing in Hän. Dene Languages Conference, Calgary, Alberta.
 Manker, Jonathan (2014). Tone Specification and the Tone-Bearing Unit (TBU) in Hän Athabascan. WSLCA 19 St. John's, Newfoundland.
 O’Leary, M. (2017) The Interaction of Wh-movement and Topicalization in Hän. 2016 Dene Language Conference Proceedings, 81–88.
 Lehman, S. B. & O’Leary, M. (2019). Unexpected Athabaskan Pronouns. In Margit Bowler, Philip T. Duncan, Travis Major, Harold Torrence (eds.), UCLA Working Papers: Schuhschrift: Papers in Honor of Russell Schuh, 122–137.

Notes

References

 Alaska Native Language Center. Alaska Native Language Center (accessed July 24, 2005).
 Mithun, Marianne. (1999). The Languages of Native North America. Cambridge: Cambridge University Press.  (hbk); .

External links
 Hän alphabet
 Alaska Native Language Center: Han
 Yukon Native Language Centre: Hän 
 The Endangered Languages Project: Han

Hän 
Northern Athabaskan languages
Indigenous languages of the North American Subarctic
Indigenous languages of Alaska
First Nations languages in Canada
Languages of the United States
Endangered Dené–Yeniseian languages
Official languages of Alaska